Para-hydroxybenzoate—polyprenyltransferase, mitochondrial is an enzyme that in humans is encoded by the COQ2 gene.

CoQ (ubiquinone) serves as a redox carrier in the mitochondrial respiratory chain and is a lipid-soluble antioxidant. COQ2, or parahydroxybenzoate-polyprenyltransferase (EC 2.5.1.39), catalyzes one of the final reactions in the biosynthesis of CoQ, the prenylation of parahydroxybenzoate with an all-trans polyprenyl group (Forsgren et al., 2004).[supplied by OMIM]

References

External links

Further reading